Vivienne Stacey (1928–2010) was the Principal and overseer United Bible Training Centre (UBTC) in Gujranwala from 1957 to 1982, working as a missionary with the Bible and Medical Missionary Fellowiship (now Interserve). Stacey is the author of over 15 books and 60 articles on subjects such as women in Pakistan and the history of Christianity in Pakistan including several in the Urdu language. Vivienne Stacey pioneered in Christian missionary work to Muslim women living in Pakistan.

Family Background

Vivienne’s father came from a large family of eight in London. Born in 1894, her father trained as a cabinet maker at a young age, limiting his basic schooling. When he was turned down for military service for England in World War I, he took night classes to improve his education and to become an accountant. This eventually led to a position first with a city firm of accountants, and later the administrative staff of Imperial College London.  Vivienne's mother was from Wales, married her father in 1927, and gave birth to Vivienne the following year. In matters of religion, her father was a lapsed Anglican and mother had ceased to be Presbyterian. Thus Vivienne was raised under the moral standards of these two denominations but without church attendance or involvement.

Schooling
Growing up, Vivienne's contact with her father was somewhat restricted because his accounting job required him to live in the city while his wife and children lived a distance away. She enrolled in the Church of England Primary School where she received some teachings of Christian values held by the Church of England at that time. With the outbreak of World War II, Vivienne as child of 11 was forced with her Mother and brother to move to mid-Wales to escape the threat of German bombing attacks, while her father remained in London to continue work and assist with the many fires that would break out because of the bombings. At fifteen, Vivienne moved back to a suburb of London, where she studied English, Latin, French, and history. Growing older, Vivienne began to become uninterested in going to the school chapels but still enjoyed churches for their architecture. At seventeen, 1945, Vivienne attended University College London, taking part in the English program provided there. University College, London was known for being “godless” being strongly influenced by rationalist and communist ideas, and lacking a chapel for students to use.

Introduction to Christianity
In the English department at University College, London, Vivienne befriended a woman by the name of Barbara who was a Christian. Barbara would meet with friends at a neighboring college that had a chapel at lunch times to attend prayer meetings. After inquiring about her friend's disappearances, Vivienne decided that she would attend the meetings, not to partake in the prayer but to observe what took place. Vivienne later said that she was astonished at the sincerity of the group but did not understand it. Feeling uneasy about her current stance as a human being without a type of faith, she converted to Christianity, claiming she had a vision of an encounter with Jesus Christ; the date was February 1946. The next day Vivienne began to attend prayer meetings. This was the Christian Union of the Inter-Varsity Fellowship or IVF shortened. In 1947 the IVF became one of the ten founding members of the International Fellowship of Evangelical Students (IFES). Following her baptism both Vivienne’s mother and father began attending church and became believers also.

Working abroad
Vivienne began taking evening classes at London Bible College and started learning New Testament Greek. Her intelligence and eagerness to learn and expand her knowledge soon gained her an admirable reputation as well as invitations to churches in nearby towns to preach to the congregations. After acquiring a more formal biblical education, Vivienne joined the Bible and Medical Missionary Fellowship (BMMF, now Interserve), desiring to participate in a missionary outreach to Muslim women. She was appointed to teach Pakistani Christian woman and train them in their witness among Muslims at the United Bible Training Centre in Gujranwala, Pakistan. After a year of preparation and the study of the local language, Urdu, Vivienne began her post at the UBTC in 1957 where she soon became Principal of the center taking on the responsibilities of administration building programs, as well as teaching for the next 25 years.

Writings
Vivienne was determined to produce books for others in her field of work with the goal to write books in the Urdu language to aid Christian women in their interaction with Muslim women. But before this was possible, Vivienne made it a requirement of herself to write in her own language, to her own people, before she attempted a cross-cultural text. After having several booklets and two books published by the BMMF, Vivienne started writing for the Masihi Isha'at Khan (MIK), or Christian Publishing House, in Lahore, Pakistan, at a time when the press did not have even two hundred titles in the local language, Urdu. Vivienne sought to write and have books published for the Christian church in Pakistan, with the contents varying from helping people relate to Muslims, attempting to cross cultural barriers, dealing with spiritual warfare, as well as various Biblical studies. Some of Vivienne’s articles subsequently appeared in about twenty languages including Korean, Kannada, Urdu, Dutch and English.

Retirement
In 1993, Vivienne retired from Interserve but continued her writing, itinerant teaching, and training leaders for Christian ministry among Muslims. Nevertheless these activities were pursued at a slower pace while she poured more of her time into writing. In the week of the 19th – 25 September 2010, Vivienne Stacey died leaving behind a legacy of a ground breaking progress between Christian and Muslim relations, specifically relating to women.

References 

 Bradshaw, Timothy. Grace and Truth in the Secular Age. Grand Rapids, MI: William B. Eerdmans, 1998.
Stacey, Vivienne. Go and Tell, A Case for Christian Mission Today. London: Concordia Press, 1974.
Stacey, Vivienne. Submitting to God: Introducing Islam. London: Hodder & Stoughton, 1997.
Stacey, Vivienne. Mission Ventured: Dynamic Stories across a Challenging World. Inter-Varsity Press, 2001.
Walker, Carol. "Vivienne Stacey: Friend, Mentor, Example."

External links 
 "Remembering Vivienne Stacey
 United Bible Tranining Centre, Gujranwala - history
 Bibliography of writings by Vivienne Stacey

1928 births
2010 deaths
English Protestant missionaries
Protestant missionaries in Pakistan
English expatriates in Pakistan
Female Christian missionaries